is an instrumental music piece by Japanese rock musician Tomoyasu Hotei. It was originally featured in the 2000 film New Battles Without Honor and Humanity (also known as Another Battle) by Junji Sakamoto, for which Hotei wrote the soundtrack and also stars in as an actor.

On the film's soundtrack, the piece is titled . A live performance of the song appears on Hotei's 2001 live album, Rock the Future Tour 2000-2001. The piece was introduced to Western audiences three years later in Quentin Tarantino's Kill Bill Volume 1 and its soundtrack, where it received the title "Battle Without Honor or Humanity". Three versions of the track are featured on Hotei's 2004 album Electric Samurai. It was released as a single on June 30, 2004, under the title . The song was named the 80th best guitar instrumental by Young Guitar Magazine in 2020.

Single track listing
"Battle Without Honor or Humanity – Original Mix"
"Battle Without Honor or Humanity – Samurai Mix"
"Battle Without Honor or Humanity – Guitar Karaoke"

Personnel
Personnel for 2004 single version;
Tomoyasu Hotei – guitar, bass, keyboards
Toshiyuki Kishi (Abingdon Boys School) – programming, audio edit
Yoichi Murata – horn arrangements, trombone
Masahiko – trumpet

Use in popular media

Films
 New Battles Without Honor and Humanity
 Kill Bill Volume 1
 Transformers
 Shrek the Third
 Kung Fu Panda (trailer only)
 Hotel for Dogs
 Team America: World Police
 Made of Honor
 Hoodwinked Too! Hood vs. Evil
 The Dictator
 Les Dalton
 The Mitchells vs. the Machines
 The Boss Baby: Family Business (trailer only)

Television episodes
 Dancing With the Stars (season 10 finale)
 Raising Hope (Season 1 Episode 22)
 Black-ish (Season 3 Episode 2)
 Bones (Season 12 Episode 6)
 My Name Is Earl (Season 1 Episode 13)

Commercials
 "Vocal Kombat" (featuring judges from The Voice in hotel lobby battle scenes) – aired during Super Bowl XLVI, Feb. 5, 2012
 "Naturally Pumped Up" (Buxton Mineral Water) – launched May 2014
 “Not For You” (Audi showcasing an electric SUV) – launched April 2019

Video games
 Dance Dance Revolution SuperNOVA
 Pop'n Music Carnival (13)
 Gran Turismo HD by Polyphony Digital (trailer for PS3)
 Rocksmith 2014 DLC

Radio/podcasts
 Ron & Fez, during their time on WJFK-FM
 The Herd with Colin Cowherd radio show syndicated in the United States via Fox Sports Radio, simulcast on Fox Sports 1
 The Chris Moyles Show, former breakfast show on BBC Radio 1 - used to introduce their 'Half Time' feature on the show at 9am
 BaD Radio Show radio show on 1310 The Ticket Dallas
 d20 Docking Bay on the Order 66 podcast
 Used as the theme from The Tom Sullivan Show, a talk radio program syndicated in the United States via NEWSTALK 910 AM in San Francisco, CA from 12noon to 3pm.
Used on alice 105.9 FM Denver weather announcement
Used as the opening theme for Drive Time Sports, a local caller-driven sports show on KABZ 103.7 The Buzz in Little Rock, AR.
Used as the theme for GLoP Culture podcast.

Sports venues
 Played when Queens Park Rangers take to the field at their home ground, Loftus Road
 Played before kickoffs at home Pittsburgh Panthers football games as well as home Pittsburgh Steelers games
 Played when Motherwell FC takes to the field at their home ground, Fir Park
 Played at Bristol City FC's home games at Ashton Gate Stadium
 Played at Sheffield United FC's home games at Bramall Lane
 Various professional wrestlers have used it for their theme music. Paul London used it during part of his tenure in Ring of Honor while Hallowicked has used it outside of his home promotion of CHIKARA Pro, most notably in IWA Mid-South's 2006 Ted Petty Invitational tournament. Yukio Sakaguchi has started to use it since beginning his career in 2012 with Dramatic Dream Team and previously used it in two of his mixed martial arts fights in the Pancrase and Shooto promotions.
Also used by Pro Wrestling Stable Makai Club
 The Kansas State Wildcats men's basketball team use "Battle Without Honor or Humanity" for their home games at Fred Bramlage Coliseum.
New York Giants pre-game kickoffs at MetLife Stadium
Played during video reviews at Madison Square Garden during New York Rangers games. 
 Bayern Munich Starting XI
 Played when Inter Milan take to the field at their home ground, San Siro

Background music for television shows
 The X Factor UK — first three series as entrance music before contestants' performances
 The X Factor USA — used as a dramatic music in many critical moments of the show
 "The Block - Australia" — judges entrance
 The X Factor UA — judges entrance
 Cultura moderna - Italian game show; used when wheeling out the shed containing the mystery celebrity guest.
 AKBingo! — pre-match trash-talk exchange
Mogali Rekulu - Telugu TV series. Used as background music for character R.K. Naidu.

References

Tomoyasu Hotei songs
2000 songs
2004 singles
Songs written for films
Songs written by Tomoyasu Hotei
funk songs